The South Africa women's national ice hockey team represents South Africa at the International Ice Hockey Federation's IIHF World Women's Championships. The women's national team is controlled by South African Ice Hockey Association. The South African national team is the only national women's ice hockey team on the entire African continent. As of 2012, South Africa has 52 female players. The South Africa women's national team is ranked 32nd in the world.

History
The South African women's national ice hockey team has participated in International Ice Hockey Federation events since the 1999 IIHF Women's World Championship. At their first World Championship in 1999, the team were unable to qualify for the B World Championship held the next year. In the following year, they were again unable to qualify for the B World Championship and were relegated several times over the following years, competing at the 2008 IIHF Women's World Championship in Division IV, the fifth World Championship level in women's ice hockey. As Divisions III to V saw no match play at the 2009 World Championship and there was no IIHF World Women's Championship in 2010 because of the Vancouver 2010 Winter Olympics, South Africa played their first World Championships match in three years in 2011, competing in Division IV.

Tournament record

Olympic games
South Africa hockey team has never qualified for an Olympic tournament.

World Championship
1999 – Not ranked (4th in 2000 Group B Qualification Pool A)
2000 – Finished in 24th place (8th in 2001 Group B Qualification)
2001 – Finished in 23rd place (4th in 2003 Division I Qualification Group A)
2003 – Finished in 25th place (5th in Division III)
2005 – Finished in 26th place (6th in Division III)
2007 – Finished in 27th place (6th in Division III, Relegated to Division IV)
2008 – Finished in 32nd place (5th in Division IV)
2009 – Division IV canceled
2011 – Finished in 30th place (5th in Division IV)
2012 – Finished in 32nd place (6th in Division IIB)
2013 – Finished in 32nd place (6th in Division IIB, Relegated to Division IIB Qualification)
2014 – Finished in 34th place (2nd in Division IIB Qualification)
2015 – Finished in 35th place (3rd in Division IIB Qualification)
2016 – Finished in 35th place (3rd in Division IIB Qualification)
2017 – Finished in 35th place (3rd in Division IIB Qualification)
2018 – Finished in 36th place (3rd in Division IIB Qualification)
2019 – Finished in 37th place (3rd in Division IIB Qualification)
2020 – Finished in 35th place (1st in Division III, Promoted to Division IIB)
2021 – Cancelled due to the COVID-19 pandemic
2022 – Finished in 30th place (4th in Division IIB)
2023 – Finished in 32nd place (4th in Division IIB)

Current squad

All-time record against other teams
As of 10 December 2015

References

External links

IIHF profile
National Teams of Ice Hockey

National ice hockey teams in Africa
Ice hockey in South Africa
Women's national ice hockey teams
Ice hockey